Kilgallen is a surname. Notable people with the surname include:

Diarmuid Kilgallen (born 2000), Irish rugby union player
Dorothy Kilgallen (1913–1965), American journalist and television game show panelist
Margaret Kilgallen (1967–2001), American artist

See also
 Kilgallon